Leonora Fani (born 18 February 1954) is an Italian former film actress.

Career
Born in Crocetta del Montello, province of Treviso, as Eleonora Cristofani, Leonora Fani was launched in 1971 by winning the "Miss Teenager" pageant. Then she had a successful career in Italian B-movies, especially in the "violent-erotic" subgenre. She played, as typical roles, young girls with traumas or perversions of various kinds, or teenagers involved in stories where eroticism is tinged with blood.

Filmography
 Metti... che ti rompo il muso (1973)
 La svergognata (1974)
 Amore mio, non farmi male (1974)
 Il domestico (1974)
 Appuntamento con l'assassino (L'agression) (1975)
 Son tornate a fiorire le rose (1975)
 Lezioni private (Private Lessons) (1975)
 ... E la notte si tinse di sangue (Naked Massacre) (1976)
 Il conto è chiuso (The Last Round) (1976)
 Perché si uccidono (1976)
 Calde labbra (1976)
 Bestialità (1976)
 Nenè (1977)
 Pensione paura (Hotel Fear) (1977)
 Giallo a Venezia (1979)
 L'ultima casa vicino al lago (Sensività) (The House by the Edge of the Lake) (1979)
 Peccati a Venezia (1980)
 Febbre a 40! (1980)
 Il giardino dell'Eden (Eden no sono) (1980)
 Champagne... e fagioli (1980)
 Uomini di parola (1981)
 Habibi, amor mío (1981)
 Dei miei bollenti spiriti (1981) (TV)
 Difendimi dalla notte (1981)

References

External links 

 

1954 births
Living people
Italian film actresses
People from the Province of Treviso
20th-century Italian actresses
Italian beauty pageant winners